The Jelajah Malaysia is an annual professional road bicycle racing stage race held in Malaysia since 1963. The race is part of the UCI Asia Tour and was classified by the International Cycling Union (UCI) as a 2.2 category races. The race exists of only a men's competition over seven stages.

History
Jelajah Malaysia is the oldest bicycle race in Malaysia and it is ranked 2.2 class by UCI (Union Cycliste Internationale). Since its inception in 1963, Jelajah Malaysia is slowly and steadily beginning to be one of the most prestigious bicycle races in Asia amongst Asian and International teams.

Through wide coverage that is empowered by local and international media, Jelajah Malaysia had proven itself as an important event in promoting Malaysia to the world as a tourism and leisure destination.

It is a platform for young Malaysian riders to compete and gain valuable experience in a cycling race. Currently many riders that is representing Malaysia now starts from their participation in the Jelajah Malaysia and the number of Malaysian riders that is accepted into international teams had increased. The exposure through Jelajah Malaysia makes the Malaysian rider a great bicycle rider for the future.

Past winners

General classification

Points classification

Mountains classification

Asian rider classification

Malaysian rider classification

Team classification

Asian team classification

Malaysian team classification

External links
 
 
 Statistics at the-sports.org
 Jelajah Malaysia at cqranking.com

 
UCI Asia Tour races
Recurring sporting events established in 1963
1963 establishments in Malaysia